This is the discography of the British rock band Marillion. Mostly associated with the progressive rock genre, they emerged as the most successful band of its second wave, neo-progressive rock, but they have also achieved over 20 UK Top 40 singles, including four which reached the Top 10. They have released nine albums which reached the Top 10 of the UK Albums Chart. Their discography includes two albums which have been Platinum-certified by the British Phonographic Industry and five which have achieved Gold status, all of which were released during their commercial peak in the 1980s.

Albums

Studio albums

Live albums
The table below only lists live albums which were released to retail on a major label. In addition, there have been many live releases on the band's own Racket Records label, which are detailed separately in the relevant section below.

Compilation albums

Box sets

Singles

Videos

VHS releases

DVD / BD releases

The tables above only list videos which were released to retail on a major label. In addition, there have been many video releases on the band's own Racket Records label, which are detailed separately in the relevant section below.

Racket Records releases

Racket Records is Marillion's own label – Racket releases are only available direct from Marillion's online shop. Some of the early releases are now out of print as CDs and DVDs, but most are available as audio downloads.

Audio releases

1Racket 62 was used in error for two different releases.

Abbey Road Live Here Now releases

Three live concerts at The Forum in London were recorded by Abbey Road Live and released on CD-R discs for sale at the venue immediately after the shows finished. These discs are joint productions between Abbey Road Live and Racket Records, and therefore are not in the regular catalogue number sequence.

Releases by other artists

Racket have also released a small number of titles by artists other than Marillion (usually band members' side projects).

Video releases

1 The Blu-ray version of Racket 102 is in standard definition only.

2 Racket 39, which is in the sequence used for CD releases, was used for the M-Tube DVD and subsequently reused for a CD release.

3 Racket 106 was used in error for two different releases.

The letter suffix to the catalogue number denotes video format:
 N denotes an NTSC DVD
 P denotes a PAL DVD
 D denotes an NTSC DVD
 BD denotes a Blu-ray Disc

Racket 91 was released on PAL and NTSC VHS – the P and N suffixes for this release denote the VHS versions.

Racket 99 has no suffix, and is NTSC-only.

Fan Club Christmas discs
Free issue to Fan Club members only, very limited runs. CDs were released from 1998 to 2008; DVDs were released from 2009 onwards. All titles now out of print, although are available for purchase as download only when taking out or renewing Fan Club membership. Most contain a Christmas message from the band members, one new Christmas-themed song, and an assortment of other tracks.

Audio releases

Video releases

Front Row Club releases

The Front Row Club was a subscription-only service by which CDs of raw concert recordings, originally made by the band for their own reference, were released. Members paid for a subscription (initially lasting six releases; later reduced to four releases), and as the shows were released, they were automatically mailed to members. There were also occasional optional releases, which were only mailed on request - these were generally reissues of previously released material. The only FRC issue which was available to non-subscribers was the Curtain Call box set - this was the only FRC release of material recorded before Steve Hogarth joined the band, and was sold via both Marillion and Fish's online stores, as well as being an optional FRC release.

After the release of FRC-040 in January 2008, the FRC changed to a download-only digital distribution format. This lasted for a further three issues - after FRC-043, the FRC was closed. (Starting with the Happiness On The Road tour, Marillion moved to publishing the majority of their live performances from desk recordings as digital downloads, rendering the FRC redundant.)

Only a limited number of copies were manufactured for each FRC release (believed to be no more than 3,000) and were not re-issued once sold out. Most of the FRC releases are now out of print on CD, but are still available from the band's website as downloads.

Notes

References

External links
Official discography of Marillion

Bibliography:
Jacqueline Chekroun, Marillion, l'ère du Poisson, France 1994. JC éditions, 99 Vallon des Vaux 06 800 Cagnes-sur-mer, France

Discographies of British artists
Rock music group discographies